Alizad is a surname. Notable people with the surname include:

Akbar Alizad (born 1973), Iranian theatre director
Arman Alizad (born 1971), Iranian-Finnish tailor, fashion columnist, and television personality

See also
Alizadeh